Dium or Dion ( or Δίων or Δίον) was a town in the northwest of ancient Euboea near the promontory Cenaeum, from which Canae in Aeolis is said to have been a colony. Dium is mentioned by Homer, as under the leadership of Elephenor, in the Catalogue of Ships in the Iliad.

Dium is tentatively identified with the site of Likhas Kastri.

References

Populated places in ancient Euboea
Former populated places in Greece
Locations in the Iliad